Dee Wilman Sanders (born April 8, 1921, in Quitman, Texas – August 17, 2007 McAlester, Oklahoma), was a Major League Baseball pitcher who played in  with the St. Louis Browns. He had signed with the Mexican Baseball League for the following season but soon decided against playing in Mexico. He batted and threw right-handed. Sanders had a 0–0 big league record, with a 40.50 ERA, in two games, in his one-year career. He attended the University of Oklahoma.

References

External links

1921 births
2007 deaths
Major League Baseball pitchers
Baseball players from Texas
St. Louis Browns players
McAlester Rockets players
People from Quitman, Texas